The 10s decade ran from January 1, AD 10, to December 31, AD 19.

In Europe, the decade saw the end of the Early Imperial campaigns in Germania when Roman forces led by Germanicus defeated Germanic tribes in the Battle of Idistaviso in AD 16. In the subsequent year, a war broke out between Maroboduus and Arminius. In Africa, Tacfarinas led his own Musulamii tribe and a loose and changing coalition of other Berber tribes in a war against the Romans in North Africa during the rule of the emperor Tiberius (AD 14–37). The Armenian Artaxiad dynasty was overthrown by the Romans. In China, the Red Eyebrows Rebellion erupted against Wang Mang, emperor of the Xin dynasty. In Korea, Daeso, the ruler of the kingdom of Dongbuyeo, led his armies into Goguryeo once again. This time, Muhyul, a prince of Goguryeo, led the armies of Goguryeo in a well-planned ambush and slaughtered all of Daeso's army. Only he and a few of his men escaped home.

Literary works from the 10s include works from the ancient Roman poet Ovid, Tristia and Epistulae ex Ponto, while Nicolaus of Damascus wrote a biography of Emperor Augustus (Bios Kaisaros).

In the Roman Empire, an edict was issued effecting an empire-wide ban on divinatory practices especially astrology. The edict requires any consultation between a customer and a practitioner to be conducted with at least one third party witness present and bans inquiry into anyone's death. A large earthquake caused the destruction of at least twelve cities in the region of Lydia in the Roman province of Asia in Asia Minor. In China, a major flooding took place in the Yellow River in AD 11, which is credited with helping bring about the fall of the Xin dynasty in the next decade.

Manning (2008) tentatively estimates the world population in AD 10 as 241 million.

Demographics 

Due to lack of reliable demographic data, estimates of the world population in the 1st century vary wildly, with estimates for AD 1 varying from 150 to 300 million. Demographers typically do not attempt to estimate most specific years in antiquity, instead giving approximate numbers for round years such as AD 1 or AD 200. However, attempts at reconstructing the world population in more specific years have been made, with Manning (2008) tentatively estimating the world population in AD 10 as 241 million.

Significant people
 Caesar Augustus, Roman Emperor (27 BC–AD 14)
 Tiberius, Roman Emperor (AD 14–37)
 Germanicus, Roman General

References